Luleå Basket is a basketball club in Luleå, Sweden. The club was established as Luleå Basketbollklubb (BBK) in 1978. Before the 2011-12 season they changed their name to Northland Basket because of sponsorship reasons. In mid-July 2015 the club changed name again to Luleå Basket. The club won the Swedish women's national basketball championship in 2014. after losing the national finals in 2005, 2006, 2007, 2011 and 2012. The club became national champions again in 2015, 2016., 2017 and 2018.

References

External links
official website 

1978 establishments in Sweden
Basketball teams established in 1978
Women's basketball teams in Sweden
Sport in Luleå